Miklós Nyárádi (21 May 1905 – 12 May 1976) was a Hungarian politician, who served as Minister of Finance between 1947 and 1948. In November 1948 he did not return home from an official visit abroad. He settled down in the United States around 1949.

References
 Magyar Életrajzi Lexikon

1905 births
1976 deaths
Politicians from Budapest
People from the Kingdom of Hungary
Independent Smallholders, Agrarian Workers and Civic Party politicians
Finance ministers of Hungary
Members of the National Assembly of Hungary (1947–1949)
Hungarian emigrants to the United States
20th-century  Hungarian economists